Streptomyces boluensis is a Gram-positive, aerobic and non-motile bacterium species from the genus of Streptomyces which has been isolated from sediments from the Yenicaga Lake in Bolu.

See also 
 List of Streptomyces species

References 

boluensis
Bacteria described in 2021